Founded in 1973, Raindirk Audio Ltd is a manufacturer of high-end, pro-audio equipment used in both recording studios and live sound reproduction. Raindirk's first console was sold to former Deep Purple singer Ian Gillan's Kingsway Studios. All products are designed by Cyril Jones.

Whilst not maintaining as high a profile as competitors like Solid State Logic, API and AMS Neve, Raindirk consoles have been used on artists as diverse as Pavarotti and Max Bygraves.

Competitors
Historically, Raindirk has produced high-end, large-format, professional recording studio consoles. As such their main competitors have been:-

 AMEK (No longer manufactured)
 Neve
 API
 Euphonix
 Harrison
 Solid State Logic
 Studer

However, in recent years Raindirk has focussed on high-end live sound applications. A recent development has been the design of high specification DI boxes and microphone pre-amps for use in DAW studios.

External links
 Raindirk Audio official web site

Notes

Audio equipment manufacturers of the United Kingdom
Companies based in Norfolk